Leo Guntara (born 17 August 1994) is an Indonesian professional footballer who plays for Borneo Samarinda mainly as a left back but also as a left midfielder.

Club career
Leo is a Semen Padang F.C. player which has twice felt the Indonesia Super League U-21 title, when he joined Sriwijaya U-21 in 2013 and Semen Padang U-21 2014.

He managed to bring Semen Padang U-21 won in the Indonesia Super League U-21 for the first time in this year after defeating Sriwijaya FC U-21.

Honours

Club
Sriwijaya U-21
 Indonesia Super League U-21: 2012–13
Semen Padang U-21
 Indonesia Super League U-21: 2014
Semen Padang
 Liga 2 runner-up: 2018

References

External links
 
 Leo Guntara at Liga Indonesia

1994 births
Living people
People from Padang
Indonesian footballers
Association football midfielders
Liga 2 (Indonesia) players
Liga 1 (Indonesia) players
Semen Padang F.C. players
Bali United F.C. players
PSPS Pekanbaru players
PSPS Riau players
PSM Makassar players
Borneo F.C. players
Sportspeople from West Sumatra